Sakhayevo (Saxay) is a rural locality (a village) and the administrative centre of Sakhayevsky Selsoviet, Karmaskalinsky District, Bashkortostan, Russia. The population was 1,615 as of 2010. There are 29 streets.

Geography 
Sakhayevo is located 17 km northeast of Karmaskaly (the district's administrative centre) by road. Ulukulevo is the nearest rural locality.

References 

Rural localities in Karmaskalinsky District